La Revue des lettres modernes is a French academic literary magazine founded in 1954 by Michel J. Minard. Originally intended to be a periodical devoted to the "history of ideas and literatures", it now publishes series of monographs devoted to authors. The headquarters of the magazine is in Paris.

References

External links
 
 
  La Revue des lettres modernes (compte rendu) by Pascale Auraix-Jonchières on Persée (year 2001, volume 31, issue 114 pp. 117–118)

1954 establishments in France
French-language magazines
Literary magazines published in France
Magazines established in 1954
Magazines published in Paris